Claudiu Drăgan (born 18 March 1979) is a Romanian former professional footballer who played as a striker. In his almost 20 years of career Drăgan played for teams such as: UTA Arad, Dinamo București, Jiul Petroșani, Progresul București or Békéscsaba Előre, among others.

Honours

Player
Dinamo București
Divizia A: 1999–2000, 2001–02, 2003–04
Cupa României: 1999–2000, 2000–01, 2002–03, 2003–04
Supercupa României: runner-up 2001, runner-up 2002, runner-up 2003

FC Baia Mare
Liga III: 2008–09

External links
 
 
 

Living people
1979 births
People from Chișineu-Criș
Romanian footballers
Association football forwards
Liga I players
Liga II players
FC Rapid București players
FC UTA Arad players
FC Dinamo București players
FC Argeș Pitești players
FC U Craiova 1948 players
CSM Jiul Petroșani players
FC Progresul București players
CS Minaur Baia Mare (football) players
Nemzeti Bajnokság II players
Békéscsaba 1912 Előre footballers
Gyulai Termál FC players
Romanian expatriate footballers
Romanian expatriate sportspeople in Hungary
Expatriate footballers in Hungary